The Assassination of Trotsky is a 1972 British historical drama film, directed by Joseph Losey with a screenplay by Nicholas Mosley. It stars Richard Burton as Leon Trotsky, as well as Romy Schneider and Alain Delon.

Plot
Exiled from the Soviet Union in 1929, Leon Trotsky travels from Turkey to France to Norway, before arriving in Mexico in January 1937. The film begins in Mexico City in 1940, during a May Day celebration. Trotsky has not escaped the attention of the Soviet dictator of the Soviet Union, Joseph Stalin, who sends out an assassin named Frank Jacson. The killer decides to infiltrate Trotsky's house by befriending one of the young communists in Trotsky's circle.

Cast
 Richard Burton as Leon Trotsky
 Alain Delon as Frank Jacson
 Romy Schneider as Gita Samuels
 Valentina Cortese as Natalia Sedowa Trotsky
 Luigi Vannucchi as Ruiz
 Jean Desailly as Alfred Rosmer
 Simone Valère as Marguerite Rosmer
 Duilio Del Prete as Felipe
 Jack Betts as  Lou (as Hunt Powers)
 Michael Forest as Jim
 Claudio Brook as Roberto
 Joshua Sinclair as Sam
 Giorgio Albertazzi as Commissioner

Production
In 1965, Josef Shaftel optioned the novel The Great Prince Died by Bernard Wolfe. The film was a co-production between the French Valoria Company and Dino De Laurentiis. It was originally to be shot in England, but was eventually filmed in Rome. The movie used Isaac Don Levine's book The Mind of an Assassin as a source.

According to author Melvin Bragg, the director Joseph Losey was so drunk and tired that he relied on long monologues by Burton to carry the film, in some cases even forgetting what was in the script. Burton himself wrote that he, or the continuity girl, would have to remind Losey of things that would have caused continuity gaffes.

Reception
The Assassination of Trotsky was included as one of the choices in the book The Fifty Worst Films of All Time.

References

External links
 
 Original New York Times Review

1972 films
1970s political drama films
Films set in 1940
British political drama films
British historical drama films
Cultural depictions of Leon Trotsky
1970s English-language films
Films about communism
French historical drama films
1970s historical drama films
Drama films based on actual events
Films directed by Joseph Losey
Films set in Mexico
Films about assassinations
English-language French films
English-language Italian films
French political drama films
Italian historical drama films
Italian political drama films
1972 drama films
1970s British films
1970s Italian films
1970s French films